Iridomyrmex neocaledonica is a species of ant in the genus Iridomyrmex. Described by Heterick and Shattuck in 2011 and unlike most Iridomyrmex ants, the ant is endemic to New Caledonia.

Etymology
The name derives from Latin, which refers to its distribution (New Caledonia).

References

Iridomyrmex
Insects of New Caledonia
Insects described in 2011